Kilsyth Victoria Cottage Hospital is a health facility in Glasgow Road, Kilsyth, North Lanarkshire, Scotland. It is managed by NHS Lanarkshire.

History
The facility was intended to commemorate the diamond jubilee of Queen Victoria and was commissioned to treat workers who had suffered accidents in the local mines. It was financed by the miners themselves, designed by Ronald Walker in the Arts and Crafts style and opened by Sir Archibald Edmonstone in April 1903. The facility joined the National Health Service in 1948 and was extended in 1974. A plaque was erected at the front of the building to commemorate its centenary in April 2003.

References

1903 establishments in Scotland
Hospitals established in 1903
Hospital buildings completed in 1903
NHS Scotland hospitals
Hospitals in North Lanarkshire
NHS Lanarkshire